The René Goscinny award, named after the writer of Asterix and Lucky Luke, is awarded to comic writers at the Angoulême International Comics Festival. It was first awarded in 1988 and 1992, every year between 1995 and 2008, and again since 2017. The award is given in order to encourage young comic writers, those whose comic careers have only begun to flourish. The awardee is chosen by a jury mostly composed of comics specialists: authors, journalists, and Angoulême festival organizers. The winner receives 5000 euro.

1980s
 1988: Pierre-Jean Bichose for Colère obscure, artist Zimmermann, Dargaud
 1989: No award given

1990s
 1990 – 1991: No awards given
 1992: Claude Carré for Le Pays miroir: l'Incendiaire, Dargaud
 1993 – 1994: No awards given
 1995: Sylvain Chomet for Léon la came, in collaboration with Nicolas de Crécy, Casterman
 1996: Nicolas Dumontheuil for Qui a tué l'idiot, Casterman
 1997: Joann Sfar for La fille du professeur, artist Emmanuel Guibert, Dupuis
 1998: Tonino Benacquista for L'Outremangeur, Casterman
 1999: Éric Liberge for Monsieur Mardi-Gras Descendres, Zone créative

2000s
 2000: Jean-Philippe Stassen for Déogratias, Dupuis
 2001: Emile Bravo for La Réplique Inattendue, Dargaud
 2002: Hervé Bourhis for Thomas ou le retour du Tabou, Les Humanoïdes Associés
 2003: Riad Sattouf for Les Pauvres Aventures de Jérémie part 1, Dargaud
 2004: Bruno Le Floc’h for Trois Éclats blancs, Delcourt
 2005: Gipi for Notes pour une histoire de guerre, Actes Sud
 2006: Ludovic Debeurme for Lucille, Futuropolis
 2007: Jul for Le guide du moutard: Pour survivre à 9 mois de grossesse, Glénat
 2008 : Chloé Cruchaudet for Groenland Manhattan, éditions Delcourt.
2009-2016 no awards given
 2017 : Emmanuel Guibert for Martha et Alan and lifes work.
 2018 : Jean Harambat for Opération Copperhead, éditions Dargaud.

2020s
2020:  and Fabien Vehlmann for Le Dernier atlas
2021: Loo Hui Phang for Black-Out (Futuropolis)

Notes

External links
 Prix René Goscinny at the René Goscinny official homepage (in French)

Angoulême International Comics Festival